The Chocoaré - Mato Grosso Extractive Reserve ( is an extractive reserve in the state of Pará, Brazil.

Location

The Chocoaré - Mato Grosso Extractive Reserve is in the municipality of Santarém Novo, Pará.
It protects part of the right (east) shore of the Maracanã River.
The Maracanã Marine Extractive Reserve protects the left (west) bank, and extends further north.
Vegetation in the alluvial areas is mangrove.
The local people harvest crabs as a source of income.
The West Indian manatee (Trichechus manatus) is protected in the reserve.

History

The Chocoaré - Mato Grosso Extractive Reserve was created by federal decree on 13 December 2002.
It is administered by the Chico Mendes Institute for Biodiversity Conservation (ICMbio).
The reserve is classed as IUCN protected area category VI (protected area with sustainable use of natural resources).
Its objectives are to protect the livelihoods and culture of the traditional extractive population, and ensure sustainable use of natural resources.

On 22 June 2005 the Instituto Nacional de Colonização e Reforma Agrária (INCRA: National Institute for Colonization and Agrarian Reform)  recognised it as meeting the needs of 300 families of small rural producers, who would qualify for PRONAF support.
The consultative council was created on 24 September 2007.
ICMBio was given responsibility on 15 March 2010.

Notes

Sources

Marine extractive reserves of Brazil
Protected areas of Pará
2002 establishments in Brazil
Protected areas established in 2002